Charles E. Holway (19 April 1885 – November 1975) was an American sprinter. At his peak at the beginning of the twentieth century, following his defeat of champion Australians Jack Donaldson and Arthur Postle, Holway was considered a world champion sprinter. He was born in Attleboro, Massachusetts, and took to running at an early age. He became a professional in 1905, defeating a number of runners in the United States before travelling to England and Wales in 1908. In the latter, he won a national competition in Pontypridd. He took part in the World Sprint Championship in 1911, and his defeat of Postle later in his career was the first time the latter had ever been defeated.

References

American male sprinters
1885 births
1975 deaths
People from Attleboro, Massachusetts